The Moscow rules are rules-of-thumb said to have been developed during the Cold War to be used by spies and others working in Moscow.

The rules are associated with Moscow because the city developed a reputation as being a particularly harsh locale for clandestine operatives who were exposed. The list may never have existed as written.

The rules 
Agent Tony Mendez wrote:Although no one had written them down, they were the precepts we all understood for conducting operations in the most difficult of operating environments: the Soviet capital. By the time they got to Moscow, everyone knew these rules. They were dead simple and full of common sense.In the International Spy Museum in Washington, D.C., the Moscow Rules are given as:
 Assume nothing. 
 Never go against your gut.
 Everyone is potentially under opposition control.
 Do not look back; you are never completely alone.
 Go with the flow, blend in.
 Vary your pattern and stay within your cover.
 Lull them into a sense of complacency.
 Do not harass the opposition.
 Pick the time and place for action.
 Keep your options open.

Fictional references 

Moscow rules are prominently referred to in John le Carré's cold war books including Tinker, Tailor, Soldier, Spy and Smiley's People, as tradecraft, including use of inconspicuous signal markers (drawing pins, chalk marks), the use of dead drops, and the ways to signal the need for a (rare) face-to-face meeting. Moscow Rules are important at the beginning of Smiley's People, where the General invokes the rules to request a meeting with Smiley, but he is followed and killed by KGB assassins before it can happen.  The applicable rule states that no documents may be carried that cannot be instantly discarded, in this instance a 35mm negative concealed in an empty pack of cigarettes.

In Spooks there are references to the Moscow Rules. In particular, in Season 6 Episode 10, Harry Pearce tells someone, "Treat London as enemy territory, keep your head down, find an opportunity, and make a move." In an earlier episode in Season 5, rogue MI6 agent Richard Dempsey is said to be in disguise and following the Moscow Rules, where the idea of treating the place as enemy territory is repeated.

Mick Herron's Slough House (Slow Horses for television) series refers to the Moscow Rules and counters those with The London Rules.

Daniel Silva's Moscow Rules places Gabriel Allon in Moscow.

In The Middleman, episode 8 (the "Ectoplasmic Pan-Hellenic Investigation"), the Moscow Rules are recited.

The rules are also referred to briefly by character Leila in the "Too Much Information" chapter of Jonathan Franzen's novel Purity.

The rules are referred to in Jason Matthews' novel, "Palace of Treason" at p.307 (paperback).

The rules are referred to in Liam Gallagher's song Moscow Rules from his 2022 album C'mon You Know.

Season 3, Episode 7 of Tom Clancy’s Jack Ryan (TV series) on Amazon Prime Video is entitled Moscow Rules.

References

Further reading 
 Whidden. Glenn H. A Guidebook For Beginning Sweepers. Technical Services Agency

20th century in Moscow
Espionage
Cold War history of the Soviet Union
Rules
Central Intelligence Agency
Soviet Union–United States relations
Espionage techniques